Parbata D.C. Chaudhary is a member of 2nd Nepalese Constituent Assembly. She won Dang–1 seat in 2013 Nepalese Constituent Assembly election from Nepali Congress.

References

Living people
Nepali Congress politicians from Lumbini Province
21st-century Nepalese women politicians
21st-century Nepalese politicians
Nepal MPs 2017–2022
Members of the 2nd Nepalese Constituent Assembly
1966 births